Saagri may refer to:

Saagri, Rõuge Parish, a village in Võru County, Estonia
Saagri, Setomaa Parish, a village in Võru County, Estonia

See also
Sagri (disambiguation)